Cély is a commune in the Seine-et-Marne department in north-central France.

Cely may also refer to:
 Cecelia Pedescleaux (born 1945), African-American quilter
 Damien Cely (born 1989), French diver
 Jacques Laurent-Cély (1919–2000), French writer
 Laurent Éon de Cély (1735–1815), French bishop
 Nathalie Cely (born 1965), Ecuadorian government minister and ambassador
 René Maugé de Cely (1757–1802), French zoologist
 Vlasta Cely (1921–2016), Czech-British puppeteer
 William Mauricio Beltrán Cely (born 1973), Colombian sociologist

See also